Reksteren is an island in the municipality of Tysnes in Vestland county, Norway. The island lies northwest of the larger island of Tysnesøy. The small Bårdsundet strait separates the two islands and there is a road bridge connecting the two islands. The Langenuen strait runs along the west side of the island and the Bjørnafjorden lies along the north side of the island. The village of Gjøvåg lies along the western coast of the island and Reksteren Church is located along the eastern shore.

See also
List of islands of Norway

References

Islands of Vestland
Tysnes